Ball Bay is a coastal rural town, a locality and a bay in Mackay Region, Queensland, Australia.

Geography
It is the nearest settlement to Cape Hillsborough National Park.

History

Amenities
The Mackay Regional Council operate a camping ground at Ball Bay. Beach fishing is a popular local activity.

The Mackay Regional Council operates a mobile library service on a fortnightly schedule at Coconut Grove.

References

External links

 
 Town map, 1972

Towns in Queensland
Mackay Region
Coastline of Queensland
Localities in Queensland